Schneidereria is a genus of moth in the family Gelechiidae.

Species
Schneidereria pistaciella Weber, 1957
Schneidereria pistaciicola (Danilevski, 1955)
Schneidereria platyphracta (Meyrick, 1935)

References

Litini
Moth genera